The 2023 Mississippi lieutenant gubernatorial election will take place on November 7, 2023, to elect the Lieutenant Governor of Mississippi. Incumbent Republican Lieutenant Governor Delbert Hosemann is running for re-election to a second term in office. Primary elections will be held on August 8.

Republican primary

Candidates

Declared
 Delbert Hosemann, incumbent lieutenant governor
 Tiffany Longino, college professor
 Chris McDaniel, state senator and candidate for U.S. Senate in 2014 and 2018
 Shane Quick, music promoter and candidate for lieutenant governor in 2019

Results

Democratic primary

Candidates

Declared 
 Ryan Grover, marketing consultant and graphic designer

References

Lieutenant gubernatorial
2023
Mississippi